Taekwondo was contested at the 2011 Summer Universiade from August 18 to August 23 at the No. 6, No. 7, and No. 8 Pavilions at the Shenzhen Conference and Exhibition Center in Shenzhen, China.

Medal summary

Medal table

Events

Men's events

Women's events

Mixed events

References

Universiade
2011 Summer Universiade events
2011